A system of plant taxonomy, the Takhtajan system of plant classification was published by Armen Takhtajan, in several versions from the 1950s onwards. It is usually compared to the Cronquist system. It admits paraphyletic groups.

Systems 

The first classification was published in Russian in 1954,and came to the attention of the rest of the world after publication of an English translation in 1958 as Origin of Angiospermous Plants. Further versions appeared in 1959 (Die Evolution der Angiospermen) and 1966 (Sistema i filogeniia tsvetkovykh rastenii). The latter popularised Takhtajan's system when it appeared in English in 1969 (Flowering plants: Origin and dispersal). A further revision appeared in 1980.

1966 system 

 Magnoliophyta (Angiospermae)  p. 51
 Class: Magnoliatae (Dicotyledones) p. 51
 Class: Liliatae (Monocotyledones) p. 461
 Subclass A: Alismidae p. 461
 Subclass B: Liliidae p. 473 (was nom. nov.) 
 Superorder Lilianae p. 473 (was nom. nov.)
 Order Liliales p. 473
 Family Liliaceae p. 474
 Family Xanthorrhoeaceae p. 476
 Family Aphyllanthaceae p. 476
 Family Alliaceae p. 477
 Family Agavaceae p. 478
 Family Amaryllidaceae p. 480
 Family Alstroemeriaceae p. 481
 Family Haemodoraceae p. 482
 Family Hypoxidaceae p. 483
 Family Velloziaceae p. 483
 Family Philesiaceae p. 484
 Family Tecophilaeaceae p. 484
 Family Cyanastraceae p. 485
 Family Asparagaceae p. 486
 Family Smilacaceae p. 487
 Family Stemonaceae p. 487
 Family Dioscoreaceae p. 488
 Family Taccaceae p. 489
 Family Phylydraceae p. 491
 Family Pontederiaceae p. 490
 Order Bromeliales p. 492
 Order Iridales p. 494
 Order Zingiberales  p. 498
 Order Orchidales p. 505
 Superorder Juncanae  p. 510
 Subclass C: Commelinidae p. 461
 Subclass D: Arecidae p. 525

1997 system 

As published in Diversity and Classification of Flowering Plants
 Division Magnoliophyta (2 classes, 17 subclasses, 71 superorders, 232 orders, 589 families
 Class Magnoliopsida Brongn. (1843) (Dicotyledons) 11 subclasses, 55 superorders, 175 orders, 458 families
 Subclass Magnoliidae Novak ex Takht. (1967) 
 Subclass Nymphaeidae J.W. Walker ex Takht. (1997)
 Subclass Nelumbonidae Takht. (1997)
 ...
 Subclass Asteridae Takht. (1967)
 Subclass Lamiidae Takht. ex Reveal (1993)
  Class Liliopsida Batsch (1802) (Monocotyledons) 6 subclasses, 16 superorders, 57 orders, 131 families
 Subclass Liliidae Takht. (1967)
 Superorder Lilianae Takht. (1967) 14 orders
 Order Melanthiales R. Dahlgren ex Reveal (1992)
 Order Colchicales Dumort. (1829)
 Order Trilliales Takht. (1996)
 Order Liliales Perleb (1826)
 Family Liliaceae Juss., nom. cons. (1789)
 Family Medeolaceae (S. Wats.) Takht. (1987)
 Order Alstroemeriales Hutch. (1934)
 ....
 Order Asparagales Bromhead (1838)
 Order Xanthorrhoeales Takth., nom. inval. (1997)
 Order Hanguanales R. Dahlgren ex Reveal (1992)
 Superorder Dioscoreanae Takht. ex Reveal & Doweld (1999)
 Subclass Commelinidae Takht. (1967)
 Subclass Arecidae Takht. (1967)
 Subclass Alismatidae Takht. (1967)
 Subclass Triurididae Takht. ex Reveal (1992)
 Subclass Aridae Takht. (1997)

2009 system 

As published in Flowering Plants
 Phylum Magnoliophyta (flowering plants) Cronquist, Takht. & Zimmerm. ex Reveal (1996)
  Class Magnoliopsida Brongn. (1843) (Dicotyledons) p. 7
  Class Liliopsida Scop. (1760) (Monocotyledons) p. 595
 Subclass I: Alismatidae p. 589
 Subclass II: Liliidae Takht. (1966) p. 625
 Superorder Lilianae Takht. (1966)
 Order Melanthiales R. Dahlgren ex Reveal (1992)
 Order Trilliales Takht. (1996)
 Order Liliales Perleb (1826)
 1. Family Campynemataceae
 2. Family Colchicaceae
 3. Family Tricyrtidaceae
 4. Family Scoliopaceae p. 634
 5. Family Calochortaceae p. 634
 6. Family Liliaceae Juss., nom. cons. (1789) p. 634
 7. Family Medeolaceae (S. Wats.) Takht. (1987) p. 634
 Order Burmanniales
 Order Alstroemeriales Hutch. (1934)
 Order Smilacales
 Order Orchidales
 Order Iridales
 Order Amaryllidales
 Order Asparagales
 Superorder Pandananae
 Superorder Dioscoreanae Takht., nom. inval. (1997)
 Superorder Arecanae
 Subclass III: Arecidae p. 693
 Subclass IV: Commelinidae p. 699

References

Bibliography 

 
 
 
 
 

 Works by Takhtajan

External links
 Takhtajan system at CSDL, Texas.  Also, at the Norton Brown Herbarium, Maryland (with an extensive listing of synonyms, both nomenclatural and taxonomic, for each name in the system): 1, 2, 3
 Angiosperm Classification according to Armen Takhtajan, 1966

system, Takhtajan